Cold Overton is a village and former civil parish, now in the parish of Knossington and Cold Overton, in the Melton district of Leicestershire, England. In 1931 the parish had a population of 133.

History
The village's name means 'farm/settlement on a ridge'. 'Cold' was added because of the village's exposed position.

Cold Overton is listed in the Domesday Book as in the Framland Hundred of Leicestershire, with 12 ploughlands, 17 households, 4 freemen, 8 villagers, 4 smallholders, and a priest. Lordship in 1066 was held by Ulf Fenman, transferred to Fulco in 1086, with Drogo de la Beuvrière as Tenant-in-chief.

In 1870 Cold Overton was a parish in the district of Oakham. The Syston and Peterborough Railway ran close by.

In 1826 was founded an “Asylum for Female Orphans” which maintained and educated 20 girls. This orphanage had been discontinued by 1877, and in its place was  established a free school for local boys and girls. Occupations in 1877 included eight graziers, four of whom were farmers, a further farmer and a market gardener. Also listed was a schoolmistress, the parish rector, and Frewen family occupants of Cold Overton Hall.

On 1 April 1936 the parish was abolished and merged with Knossington.

St John the Baptist Church
The Grade I listed village church is dedicated to John the Baptist. Originating in the 13th century, there were additions during the following two centuries and a  restoration in 1889 Inside the Church the north and south arcades have notable Early English carved capitals, showing people, animals and motifs from nature. There are medieval paintings on the south and east walls; the images include St Catherine holding a wheel, the Assumption of the Virgin, the Nativity, the Funeral of the Virgin, complete with pall-bearers, and St John the Baptist.

Cold Overton Hall

At the centre of the village is the Grade I listed Cold Overton Hall, a country house of c. 1664 with early 19th-century additions.

References

External links

“Cold Overton”, Genuki

Villages in Leicestershire
Former civil parishes in Leicestershire
Borough of Melton